700 Naval Air Squadron (700 NAS) is an experimental test squadron in the Royal Navy’s Fleet Air Arm.

History
700 NAS was originally formed on 21 January 1940 at RNAS Hatston (HMS Sparrowhawk) in Orkney in a plan to centralise the operations of the 700 series "Catapult" flights attached to catapult units and to act as a pool and Headquarters for all catapult aircraft embarked on battleships and cruisers - chiefly the Supermarine Walrus flying boat, together with the Fairey Seafox and Fairey Swordfish floatplanes. Initial equipment comprised 42 Walruses together with 11 Seafoxes and 12 Swordfishes.

On 21 June 1940, a Walrus (P5666) of 700 Squadron on the cruiser  found the German battleship Scharnhorst but Manchester did not engage.

25 September 1940, Walrus L2247, embarked on HMAS Australia, was shot down by French Vichy fighters at Dakar and crashed into the sea all 3 crew perished.

The final successful attack on an enemy submarine by a Walrus was on 11 July 1942, when Walrus W2709 of 700 (Levant) NAS sank the Italian submarine Ondina, in conjunction with the South African surface vessels Protea and trawler HMSAS Southern Maid, east of Cyprus.

The submarine was damaged and forced to surrender, and later scuttled off the Gulf of Guinea. The crew of Petty Officer P H Parsons, Sub Lt A D Corkhill and N A Evans were all awarded gallantry medals.

700 NAS was disbanded in March 1944, pilots transferring into 771 Naval Air Squadron, but it was reformed as a Test Pilot School in October 1944.

700 NAS re-emerged in August 1955 as a Fleet Requirements unit and from 1957 was based out of RNAS Lee-on-Solent to introduce the Westland Whirlwind HAS.7.

Intensive Flying Trials Units (IFTU)
700H NAS1955-57, RNAS Lee-on-Solent, Westland Whirlwind HAS.7
700X NAS1957-58, Supermarine Scimitar F.1
700Y NAS1958-59, RNAS Yeovilton, de Havilland DH.110 Sea Vixen FAW.1
700X NAS1959-61, RNAS Yeovilton, Saro P.531
700H NAS1960-61, Fairey Gannet and Hawker Sea Hawk deck and launch trials
700H NAS1960-?, Westland Wessex HAS.1
700Z NAS1961-63, RNAS Lossiemouth, Blackburn Buccaneer S.1
700V NAS1963-64, Westland Wessex HU.5
700W NAS1963-64, Westland Wasp HAS.1
700B NAS1965-?, RNAS Lossiemouth, Blackburn Buccaneer S.2
700H NAS1967-?, Westland Wessex HAS.3
700P NAS1968-69, McDonnell Douglas F-4K Phantom II FG.1
700S NAS1969-70, Westland Sea King HAS.1
700L NAS1976-77, RNAS Yeovilton, Westland Lynx HAS.2
700A NAS1979-80, RNAS Yeovilton, BAe Sea Harrier FRS.1
700L NAS1990-92, RNAS Yeovilton, Westland Lynx HAS.2, (Lynx CTS Trials)
700M NAS1998-2008, RNAS Culdrose, AgustaWestland Merlin HM.1
700W NAS2009-2014, RNAS Yeovilton, AgustaWestland Wildcat HMA.2
700X NAS2014-, RNAS Culdrose, Boeing Insitu ScanEagle, AeroVironment RQ-20 Puma QinetiQ Banshee Jet 80+

700 NAS disbanded again at RNAS Yeovilton in July 1961. However, a number of Intensive Flying Trials Units were subsequently formed under the "700 NAS" title, to prepare for new aircraft types coming into service. These operated as independent units, each being identified by a suffix letter after the squadron number (e.g. "700B").

Several of these IFTUs were formed for the introduction of the Westland Wessex, Blackburn Buccaneer, McDonnell Douglas F-4 Phantom II, Westland Sea King, Westland Lynx and BAe Sea Harrier into the Fleet Air Arm.

More recently, the squadron was re-commissioned at RNAS Culdrose in December 1998 as 700M Squadron, with a primary role of testing and evaluating the  AgustaWestland Merlin HM.1 helicopter. 700M disbanded on 31 March 2008, transferring its aircraft and personnel to 824 Naval Air Squadron and also forming a new flight, 824 OEU. The squadron reformed again as 700W NAS in May 2009 at Yeovilton as the Lynx Wildcat Fielding Squadron. 700W expects to receive up to five Wildcats from January 2013 for operational evaluation and conversion training. The squadron was disbanded in July 2014 when it was merged with 702 NAS to form 825 Naval Air Squadron, the first operational Wildcat unit.

Present day
The Squadron currently operates as 700X NAS and undertakes RPAS trials, and also acts as a parent unit for the various ship-based flights operating the Insitu Scan Eagle UAV. In November 2019, 700 NAS tested two new UAS, namely, the AeroVironment RQ-20 Puma and the AeroVironment Wasp III.

Aircraft operated
AgustaWestland Merlin
Westland Lynx (introduction to service)
Supermarine Walrus
Westland Whirlwind (tests)
De Havilland Sea Vixen
Fairey Gannet (tests)
Hawker Sea Hawk (tests)
Saunders-Roe P.531 (tests) (only 6 built)
Westland Wasp (introduction to service)
Westland Sea King (introduction to service)
Boeing Insitu Scaneagle (introduction to service)

References

External links
 700X Naval Air Squadron at Royal Navy.mod.uk
 Helicopter History of 700 Squadron

700 series Fleet Air Arm squadrons
Military units and formations established in 1940
Air squadrons of the Royal Navy in World War II
Military of the United Kingdom in Cornwall